Action of Churches Together in Scotland (ACTS) is a national ecumenical organisation of churches in Scotland, founded in 1990. It is the successor to the former Scottish Council of Churches. ACTS is one of the four national ecumenical bodies in the UK, with equivalent bodies being Churches Together in England, Cytûn in Wales and the Irish Council of Churches, plus Churches Together in Britain and Ireland. The ACTS office was originally located in Dunblane, then in Alloa and finally in Stirling.

Since June 2021 ACTS has been effectively superseded by the Scottish Church Leaders' Forum. As of May 2022 ACTS remains in existence for legal and administrative purposes only, governed by its Trustees but without staff.

The member churches of ACTS
 Church of Scotland
 Congregational Federation
 Methodist Church
 Religious Society of Friends (Quakers)
 Roman Catholic Church in Scotland
 Salvation Army
 Scottish Episcopal Church
 United Free Church of Scotland
 United Reformed Church

Secretariat
From May 2018, the Interim General Secretary was the Rev. Ian Boa (who succeeded the Reverend Matthew Ross, a minister of the Church of Scotland, who took up a new post with the World Council of Churches). The Assistant General Secretary (since 2011) is the Reverend Ian Boa of the United Free Church of Scotland; he succeeded the Revd Lindsey Sanderson of the United Reformed Church. There were also two Programme Officers to support the work of ACTS.

When first created, the office of ACTS was located at the former Scottish Churches House in Dunblane. In 2006 the ACTS office was moved to Forrester Lodge, adjacent to Inglewood House in Alloa, but in October 2015 it was relocated to Stirling, in a self-contained office within the headquarters building of Volunteer Scotland. Scottish Churches House was opened in 1960, closed in 2011 and subsequently converted into a hotel.

General Secretaries of ACTS
The Rev Maxwell Craig 1990-1999 
The Rev Dr Kevin Franz 1999-2007
Br Stephen Smyth 2007-2014
The Rev Matthew Ross 2014-2018
The Ian Boa (Interim General Secretary) 2018-2021

Working as Churches Together
ACTS was a place where churches meet, experience, reflect, share and act together. There were a number of projects which ACTS coordinates across Scotland. It was not intended that ACTS should develop into a "superchurch". Prior to 2003, four member churches of ACTS were part of the "Scottish Churches Initiative for Union" (which sought institutional unity - a project which ACTS was not part of), but a negative vote at the General Assembly in 2003 necessitated the withdrawal of the Church of Scotland from SCIFU. Henceforth, greater emphasis has been placed on the development of Local Ecumenical Partnerships.

The principle of being Churches Together was of central importance to the work of ACTS. Essentially, this is known as the "Lund Principle" (which was adopted in Lund by churches at the third world conference on Faith and Order in August 1952.) This states: "the churches should act together in all matters ... except those in which deep difference of conviction compel them to act separately"

Governance of ACTS
The agenda of ACTS was set at a national level by the church denominations through their representatives on the "Members' Meeting". To comply with the requirements of the Office of the Scottish Charity Regulator, the legal responsibility for the oversight and governance of ACTS is vested in Trustees, chaired by the Convener of ACTS and supported by the Secretariat. As of 2022 the Board of Trustees remains in existence.

Conveners of ACTS
2009-2011 The Rev Fr Philip Kerr (Roman Catholic Church)
2011-2013 The Rev Dr Douglas Galbraith (Church of Scotland)
2013-2015 Mrs Helen Hood (Scottish Episcopal Church)
2015-2017 The Rev John Butterfield (Methodist Church)
2017-2019 The Very Rev Monsignor Philip Kerr (Roman Catholic Church)

Programmes
ACTS worked through its Programme Groups, Partner Group and Bodies in Association. Programme Groups (directly under the responsibility of ACTS) include the Scottish Churches Rural Group, Scottish Churches Anti-Human Trafficking Group and the Scottish Churches Education Group. Partner Groups (administratively and financially supported by ACTS, but with autonomous management) include the Scottish Churches Racial Justice Group. The ACTS Ecumenical Development Group promoted local ecumenism. Before restructuring in the early 2010s, ACTS had four "Networks".

Scottish Churches' Committee
A separate body, the Scottish Churches' Committee, is responsible for liaison with public authorities on legal (rather than spiritual) matters - such as changes to legislation and the resulting effect on churches (such as planning law, changes to local government taxation, etc.). Seven of the nine members of ACTS are also members of the SCC (i.e. all but the two smallest, namely the Congregational Federation and the Quakers). The SCC also includes the Baptist Church, the Free Church of Scotland and several smaller Presbyterian churches. The Secretary of the SCC is the Solicitor of the Church of Scotland. It also co-operates with the UK-wide Churches Legislation Advisory Services (CLAS), formerly known as the Churches' Main Committee.

See also
 ACT Alliance
 Conference of European Churches
 Ecumenism
 Scottish Churches Parliamentary Office
 Society, Religion and Technology Project
 The Council of Christians and Jews (CCJ)
 World Council of Churches
 World Communion of Reformed Churches

References

External links
 Action of Churches Together in Scotland

Christian organizations established in 1990
Christian organisations based in Scotland
Scotland
Christian ecumenical organizations
Christian denominations established in the 20th century
Church of Scotland